Orestiada (formerly , Nea Orestiás), is the northeasternmost, northernmost and newest city of Greece and the second largest town of the Evros regional unit of Thrace. Founded by Greek refugees from Edirne after the Treaty of Lausanne when the population exchange occurred between Turkey and Greece, in which the river Evros became the new border between the two countries. The population is around 20,000.

History

Ancient Orestiada was located in present-day Turkey, across the river from the current town of Kastanies. In ancient times, there was a small settlement on this site which legends claim was founded by Orestes, the son of Agamemnon and Clytemnestra.

In 1920, after the liberation of Thrace, the city was renamed Orestiada and conferred on Greece along with the whole of Western Thrace and most of Eastern Thrace under the Treaty of Sevres. Following the Greco-Turkish War (1919–1922) and the Armistice of Mudanya (October 1922), the Western Forces surrendered Eastern Thrace to Turkey and the Greek army was ordered to withdraw within 15 days to positions east of Evros. As a result, Adrianople (renamed Edirne) which is located to the east of Evros, became Turkish, but Karagatch, located to the west of Evros, remained in Greece. As Eastern Thrace was evacuated by its Greek population, several residents of Edirne fled to its neighboring suburb, Karagatch, on the other bank of the river (the west and still Greek), hoping that something would change and they could go back to their homes more easily. However at the Lausanne conference, the British representative Secretary of State for Foreign Affairs Curzon, with French Prime Minister Poincaré, Italian Prime Minister Mussolini and United States High Commissioner Admiral Mark L. Bristol, failed to reach a compromise with Ismet Pasha, the chief negotiator for Turkey. Effects were made more difficult following protests by the Turks and hindered still further by Admiral Bristol's explicit support for Turkish efforts.

As compensation to the new Turkish republic, Greece was asked to pay 4 billion gold francs (half of the cost Greek military and commercial fleet), to leave the Ecumenical Patriarchate from Constantinople and hold a referendum in Western Thrace to decide its future. In reaction to Eleftherios Venizelos, in May 1923, the French general Mauritius Pelley argued: "Since Greece cannot pay, the old Orestiada (Karagatch) should be given to the Turks." His proposal was accepted. Karagatch, with the villages of Bosna and Demerdes, were transferred to Turkish control, along with the strategic railhead and Karagatch railway station which at the time served Edirne also. The 17,000 Greek inhabitants of the Karagatch Triangle learned of this concession on 27 May 1923. The abandonment of the old Orestiada began in July 1923, as the population moved beyond the Evros River, the new border. At 10:20, 15 September 1923 around 1500 years of Greek orthodox history was at an end. On 4 June 1923, a committee, which had only been formed the day before at a joint meeting of the inhabitants of old Orestiada, traveled 17 kilometers south, to the uninhabited rural site of Kum-Tsiflik (Sandy Estate), to view the possible new settlement. On 12 August 1923, the new city called New Orestias and later New Orestiada was inaugurated to remind the old Orestiada, Karagatch. The inauguration of the new city took place in August 1923 by the Metropolitan of Adrianople Polycarpos, with Spyros Dassios also in attendance.

Economy
Orestiada has a medical center, an orchestra, and a choir as well as a sugar factory, outside the city which processes locally grown sugar beets.  Asparagus, potatoes, tobacco, watermelons, and corn are also grown. As well, a cattle breeding fund gives commercial impetus to the city and the whole area which is in such an economically strategic location in Europe.

It is also the site of the Fylakio detention center for refugees seeking asylum in Greece. In November 2010, the European Union sent Frontex forces to Orestiada to help Greek police patrol the local section of the border with Turkey. Some 31,400 people crossed just that portion of the border in the first nine months of 2010.

Geography
Orestiada lies in the plain of the river Evros, at 40 metres above sea level. Orestiada is only 6 km west of the banks of the Evros, which forms a natural border between Greece and Turkey. Orestiada is located 17 km north of Didymoteicho, 19 km south of Edirne, 28 km southeast of the Greek-Turkish-Bulgarian tripoint, 40 km southeast of Svilengrad, 91 km northeast of Alexandroupoli, and 212 km west of Istanbul.

Transport

Road
The Greek National Road 51/E85 passes 1 km to the west of Orestiada.

Rail
The city is served by two railway stations, the larger Orestiada railway station, and a smaller station Sakkos, both on the Alexandroupoli–Svilengrad line. Historically the city was on the İstanbul Sirkeci-Svilengrad line, since 1971 a parallel railway line that runs exclusively over Turkish territory so that the Orestiada station is now touched only by regional traffic.

Education
In 1999, Orestiada became the fourth town to host university departments (faculties) of the Democritus University of Thrace. The faculties based in Orestiada are the Department of Agricultural Development and the Department of Forestry, Environmental Management and Natural Resources. Both faculties have a five-year curriculum. More than 800 students live in the city.

Sports
Orestias hosts two sports club with presence in the higher national divisions, Orestis Orestiadas F.C. a football club and A.C. Orestias a volleyball club, playing in A1 Ethniki.

Climate

Municipality

The municipality Orestiada was formed at the 2011 local government reform by the merger of the following 4 former municipalities, that became municipal units:
Kyprinos
Orestiada
Trigono
Vyssa

The municipality has an area of 955.591 km2, the municipal unit 256.898 km2.

Communities

The municipal unit Orestiada is subdivided into the following communities (constituent settlements in brackets):
Orestiada (Orestiada, Lepti, Neos Pyrgos, Palaia Sagini, Sakkos)
Ampelakia
Chandras
Megali Doxipara
Neo Cheimonio
Neochori (Neochori, Patagi)
Thourio
Valtos

Province
The province of Orestiada was one of the provinces of the Evros Prefecture. It had the same territory as the present municipality. It was abolished in 2006.

Population

The population of the settlements within the municipal community of Orestiada at the 2011 census was:
Orestiada 18,426
Lepti 641
Neos Pyrgos 943
Palaia Sagini 15
Sakkos 186

See also
List of settlements in the Evros regional unit

References

 
Populated places in Evros (regional unit)
Municipalities of Eastern Macedonia and Thrace
Provinces of Greece